Grannies may refer to:

 Female grandparents (or by extension elderly women)
 Raging Grannies, name for groups of activist elderly women who advocate for social justice

See also
 Granny (disambiguation)
 Grammies (Grammy Awards)